Barney's Barrier Reef is a British documentary program launched by the CBBC in 2009, presented by Barney Harwood and Gemma Hunt. The structure of the program shows the links between animals from the Great Barrier Reef. It involves at least 10 to 12 animals each episode. Barney used an animal as a 'little cheat' as described by Gemma, because it was Humans. Barney's Barrier Reef mostly involves fish since the Great Barrier Reef is in an ocean. Land animals are hardly used in this series, but then they are mostly used in the proceeding series: Barney's Latin America, although some fish, like the blind sea shrimp, are featured. Barney's Barrier Reef featured 20 episodes.

British children's television series